The 2015–16 Czech Women's First League is the 23rd season of the Czech Republic's top-tier football league for women. Slavia Prague were the defending champions.

Format
The eight teams will play each other twice for a total of 14 matches per team. After that the top four teams will play a championship round for another six matches per team. The bottom placed four teams play the relegation round. Points accumulated after the regular season are halved and added the points from the next round. The champion and runners-up qualify for the 2016–17 UEFA Women's Champions League.

Teams

Regular season

Standings
The regular season ended on 27 March 2016.

Results

Final stage
Points of the regular season were halved and rounded up, goal difference was kept.

Championship group
Played by the teams placed first to fourth of the regular season. Teams play each other twice.

Relegation group
Played by the teams placed fifth to eighth of the regular season. Teams play each other twice.

Personnel and kits

Note: Flags indicate national team as has been defined under FIFA eligibility rules. Players may hold more than one non-FIFA nationality.

Top goalscorers
Updated to games played on 28 May 2016.

References

2015–16 domestic women's association football leagues
2015–16 in Czech football
Czech Women's First League seasons